"Kinda Don't Care" is a song by American country music singer Justin Moore. It is the title track to, and the third single from, his fourth studio album Kinda Don't Care. The song was written by Rhett Akins, Ben Hayslip, and Ross Copperman.

History
Moore told The Boot that his producer Jeremy Stover found the song when seeking material for an album, and that Moore was inspired to record it because he knew that Rhett Akins and Ross Copperman, with whom he had written previously, were writers on the song. He thought that the lyrics had "unique ideas", and that the song's sound reminded him of Hank Williams Jr. He also said that he wanted to release it as a single because it had received positive reactions in concert even before it was released.

A music video, directed by Cody Villalobos, features Moore performing the song at various live shows.

Charts

Weekly charts

Year-end charts

References

2017 singles
2016 songs
Justin Moore songs
Songs written by Rhett Akins
Songs written by Ross Copperman
Songs written by Ben Hayslip
Big Machine Records singles
Song recordings produced by Jeremy Stover